The rufous-winged antshrike (Thamnophilus torquatus) is a species of bird in the family Thamnophilidae.
It is found in Bolivia, Brazil, and Paraguay; the northwestern half of its range is much of the southeast Amazon Basin. Its natural habitats are subtropical or tropical moist lowland forests, dry savanna, and subtropical or tropical moist shrubland.

The rufous-winged antshrike was described by the English naturalist William Swainson in 1825 and given its current binomial name Thamnophilus torquatus.

References

External links
Photo; Article chandra.as.utexas.edu
Photo-High Res; Article tropicalbirding—site 2
Photo-High Res; Article tropicalbirding
Photo-Medium Res; Article ib.usp.br—"Thamnophiladae"

rufous-winged antshrike
Birds of Brazil
Birds of the Cerrado
rufous-winged antshrike
Taxonomy articles created by Polbot